Pete Podgorski (born December 1953) is a former amateur and professional - Junior Welterweight, Welterweight & light middleweight boxer, as well as a boxing official.

As an amateur, Podgorski compiled a 45-12 record, along with twenty knockouts. The 1972 C.Y.O. Catholic Youth Organization  Welterweight Champion, 1973 Fox Valley, Wisconsin Golden Gloves Champion, and 1977 C.P.D. Chicago Park District Open division 156 lb. Champion also fought as a member of the United States national boxing teams. Occasionally nicknamed the "Polish Hammer" and "The Percentage Man", he is of Polish, Russian, Irish and French descent.  Mothers last name was, La Montagne.
As a professional boxer, Podgorski compiled a 22-14 record with sixteen knockouts

Professional boxing record

|-
|align="center" colspan=8|22 Wins (16 knockouts, 6 decisions), 14 Losses (8 knockouts, 6 decisions), 1 No Contest 
|-
| align="center" style="border-style: none none solid solid; background: #e3e3e3"|Result
| align="center" style="border-style: none none solid solid; background: #e3e3e3"|Record
| align="center" style="border-style: none none solid solid; background: #e3e3e3"|Opponent
| align="center" style="border-style: none none solid solid; background: #e3e3e3"|Type
| align="center" style="border-style: none none solid solid; background: #e3e3e3"|Round
| align="center" style="border-style: none none solid solid; background: #e3e3e3"|Date
| align="center" style="border-style: none none solid solid; background: #e3e3e3"|Location
| align="center" style="border-style: none none solid solid; background: #e3e3e3"|Notes
|-align=center
|Win
|
|align=left| George Nick Mavrou
|KO
|2
|02/12/1986
|align=left| Highland, Indiana, United States
|align=left|
|-
|Loss
|
|align=left| Romolo Casamonica
|TKO
|3
|25/09/1986
|align=left| Paris, France
|align=left|
|-
|Win
|
|align=left| Tom Lally
|KO
|3
|01/08/1986
|align=left| LaPorte, Indiana, United States
|align=left|
|-
|Win
|
|align=left| John Malars
|TKO
|1
|22/07/1986
|align=left| Highland, Indiana, United States
|align=left|
|-
|Loss
|
|align=left| Ernie Houser
|TKO
|2
|17/06/1986
|align=left| Sterling Heights, Michigan, United States
|align=left|
|-
|Loss
|
|align=left| Chris Bajor
|UD
|6
|20/08/1985
|align=left| Tropicana Hotel & Casino, Atlantic City, New Jersey, United States
|align=left|
|-
|Win
|
|align=left| Brandon Quarry
|KO
|5
|12/07/1985
|align=left| Cudahy, Wisconsin, United States
|align=left|
|-
|Loss
|
|align=left| Randy Mitchem
|UD
|8
|23/04/1985
|align=left| Tropicana Hotel & Casino, Atlantic City, New Jersey, United States
|align=left|
|-
|Win
|
|align=left| Rich Herman
|TKO
|3
|16/04/1985
|align=left| Highland, Indiana, United States
|align=left|
|-
|Win
|
|align=left| Brandon Quarry
|KO
|2
|20/03/1985
|align=left| Cudahy, Wisconsin, United States
|align=left|
|-
|Win
|
|align=left| Mike Szymanski
|TKO
|3
|11/03/1985
|align=left| Century Center, South Bend, Indiana, United States
|align=left|
|-
|Loss
|
|align=left| Jack Callahan
|MD
|6
|22/02/1985
|align=left| Hammond Civic Center, Hammond, Indiana, United States
|align=left|
|-
|Loss
|
|align=left| Danny Ferris
|TKO
|7
|20/12/1984
|align=left| Saratoga Springs, New York, United States
|align=left|
|-
|Win
|
|align=left| Gary Granite
|KO
|2
|20/11/1984
|align=left| Highland, Indiana, United States
|align=left|
|-
|Win
|
|align=left| Jerry Tucker
|UD
|4
|18/09/1984
|align=left| Highland, Indiana, United States
|align=left|
|-
|Loss
|
|align=left| Bruce Strauss
|SD
|8
|10/07/1984
|align=left| Highland, Indiana, United States
|align=left|
|-
|Win
|
|align=left| John Schirico
|KO
|1
|13/03/1984
|align=left| Highland, Indiana, United States
|align=left|
|-
|Loss
|
|align=left| Arnie Wells
|TKO
|2
|23/11/1983
|align=left| Russellville, Michigan, United States
|align=left|
|-
|Win
|
|align=left| Jerome McKinney
|KO
|2
|19/11/1983
|align=left| Hammond Civic Center, Hammond, Indiana, United States
|align=left|
|-
|Loss
|
|align=left| Gary Gibson
|TKO
|5
|18/10/1983
|align=left| Tropicana Hotel & Casino, Atlantic City, New Jersey, United States
|align=left|
|-
|Loss
|
|align=left| Mike Mungin
|TKO
|4
|07/09/1983
|align=left| Hammond Civic Center, Hammond, Indiana, United States
|align=left|
|-
|Win
|
|align=left| John Schirico
|KO
|1
|05/07/1983
|align=left| Eagles Club, Milwaukee, Wisconsin, United States
|align=left|
|-

|Win
|
|align=left| Adrian Green
|UD
|6
|03/01/1983
|align=left| Chicago, Illinois, United States
|align=left|
|-
|Win
|
|align=left| Stan Cooper
|KO
|4
|13/12/1982
|align=left| Aragon Ballroom, Chicago, Illinois, United States
|align=left|
|-
|Win
|
|align=left| Brandon Quarry
|TKO
|3
|17/11/1982
|align=left| Hammond Civic Center, Hammond, Indiana, United States
|align=left|
|-
|Loss
|
|align=left| Ronnie Shields
|TKO
|2
|02/10/1982
|align=left| Sands Atlantic City, Atlantic City, New Jersey, United States
|align=left|
|-
|Loss
|
|align=left| Harold Brazier
|MD
|6
|28/09/1982
|align=left| Holiday Star Theatre, Merrillville, Indiana, United States
|align=left|
|-
|No Contest
|
|align=left| Tom Tarantino
|NC
|2
|08/12/1981
|align=left| Eagles Club, Milwaukee, Wisconsin, United States
|align=left|
|-
|Win
|
|align=left| Jeff Gettemy
|UD
|4
|30/11/1981
|align=left| Park West Theater, Chicago, Illinois, United States
|align=left|
|-
|Win
|
|align=left| Len Santana
|KO
|2
|03/01/1981
|align=left| Des Moines, Iowa, United States
|align=left|
|-
|Loss
|
|align=left| Ralph Twinning
|TKO
|3
|04/06/1979
|align=left| Bridgeview, Illinois, United States
|align=left|
|-
|Loss
|
|align=left| Robert Hughes
|MD
|4
|17/03/1979
|align=left| Alumni Hall (DePaul University), Chicago, Illinois, United States
|align=left|
|-
|Win
|
|align=left| Tony Ketchinakow
|PTS
|4
|28/02/1979
|align=left| Alumni Hall (DePaul University), Chicago, Illinois, United States
|align=left|
|-
|Win
|
|align=left| Imara Epesi
|KO
|2
|02/02/1979
|align=left| Aragon Ballroom, Chicago, Illinois, United States
|align=left|
|-
|Win
|
|align=left| Bob Al Hughes
|UD
|10
|06/06/1977
|align=left| Chicago, Illinois, United States
|align=left|
|-
|Win
|
|align=left| Larry Johnston
|KO
|3
|19/05/1977
|align=left| Chicago, Illinois, United States
|align=left|
|-
|Win
|
|align=left| Jorge Vasquez
|UD
|4
|07/04/1977
|align=left| Chicago, Illinois, United States
|align=left|
|}

References

External links
 Amateur boxing record:
 
 * Boxing record and officiating history from BoxRec.com Encyl.
 * Podgorski Boxing family members
 In March 2012 Podgorski was elected Chicago's 36th Ward Committeeman (R)
 In March 2016 Podgorski was elected Chicago's 38th Ward Committeeman (R) 
http://www.fightnews.com/Boxing/the-results-are-in-podgorski-re-elected-329130
 http://www.fightnews.com/Boxing/ibf-33rd-convention-day-4-report-339283

1953 births
Living people
American boxing referees
Boxers from Chicago
Politicians from Chicago
Illinois Republicans
American male boxers
Light-middleweight boxers